HMS Hastings was a 32-gun fifth rate built by Isaac Betts of Woodbridge in 1696/98. She was employed in convoy service, trade protection and counter piracy patrols. She was wrecked off Greater Yarmouth in February 1707.

She was the second vessel to bear the name Hastings since it was used for a 32-gun fifth rate built by Thomas Ellis of Shoreham on 5 February 1695 then wrecked 1697 off Waterford.

Construction and Specifications
She was ordered on 1696 to be built under contract by Isaac Betts of Woodbridge. She was launched on 17 May 1698. Her builder's measure tonnage was calculated as 381 tons (burthen).

The gun armament initially was four demi-culverins on the lower deck (LD) with two pair of guns per side. The upper deck (UD) battery would consist of between twenty and twenty-two 6-pounder guns with ten or eleven guns per side. The gun battery would be completed by four 4-pounder guns on the quarterdeck (QD) with two to three guns per side.

Commissioned Service 1698-1707
She was commissioned in 1698 under the command of Captain Richard White (died 7 July 1700). She sailed in early 1699 for the East Indies. Captain Edward Rumsey took command on 1 September 1699 to return to Home Waters. In 1702 she was under Captain Richard Culliford for patrolling the Bristol Channel. He was followed by Captain Thomas Kenney in 1703. Captain Charles Parsons took command on 6 April 1704 then Captain Philip Stanhope on 7 November 1704. She sailed to Guinea on the east coast of Africa in 1705. Later that year Commander Francis Vaughan took command for convoy service in the North Sea.

Loss
She was wrecked in a storm near Great Yarmouth on 9 February 1707. Only 24 personnel survived the sinking. Captain Vaughan was drowned in the mishap.

Notes

Citations

References

 Winfield (2009), British Warships in the Age of Sail (1603 – 1714), by Rif Winfield, published by Seaforth Publishing, England © 2009, EPUB 
 Colledge (2020), Ships of the Royal Navy, by J.J. Colledge, revised and updated by Lt Cdr Ben Warlow and Steve Bush, published by Seaforth Publishing, Barnsley, Great Britain, © 2020, EPUB 
 Lavery (1989), The Arming and Fitting of English Ships of War 1600 - 1815, by Brian Lavery, published by US Naval Institute Press © Brian Lavery 1989, Part V Guns, Type of Guns
 Clowes (1898), The Royal Navy, A History from the Earliest Times to the Present (Vol. II). London. England: Sampson Low, Marston & Company, © 1898

 

Frigates of the Royal Navy
Ships of the Royal Navy
1690s ships